Julius Prüwer (20 February 1874 – 8 July 1943) was an Austrian conductor, pianist and academic teacher.

Life 
Born in Vienna, Prüwer studied piano at the Vienna Conservatory from 1886 to 1891 with Arthur Friedheim and Moriz Rosenthal and music theory with Robert Fuchs, Franz Krenn, and (privately) with Johannes Brahms. As a conductor, he was trained by Hans Richter and worked first at the Bielitz Municipal Theater in 1892/93, at the Esseg Municipal Theater in 1893/94, and at the Cologne Opera in 1894/95. From 1895 to 1923, he was Kapellmeister at the Stadttheater Breslau, and from 1913 to 1923, he was also director of the opera there. Among other things, he conducted the German premiere of Mussorgsky's Boris Godunov there and in 1898 made a tour to St. Petersburg, where he arranged the Russian premiere of Wagner's Tristan und Isolde. In 1902, 1904, and 1906, he assisted Hans Richter at the Bayreuth Festival. In 1909, he published a music guide to Elektra by Richard Strauss.

In 1923/24 Prüwer was General Music Director at the Deutsches Nationaltheater und Staatskapelle Weimar, then full professor at the Berlin University of the Arts from 1924 to 1933. In 1925, the Berlin Philharmonic chose him to conduct their popular concerts, and he conducted on more than 700 evenings until 1933. In 1933, he lost his posts because of his Jewish origins. In 1936, he took over the symphony orchestra of the Kulturbund Deutscher Juden in Frankfurt and taught at the Hollaender Jewish Private Music School in Berlin. In 1939, he emigrated to New York City, where he later taught at the College of Music and conducted the New York City Symphony Orchestra.

He was married with the opera singer Fanchette Verhunc.

Prüwer died in New York City at the age of 69.

Recordings 
From 1928 to 1930, Prüwer made numerous recordings for the Deutsche Grammophon Gesellschaft. He accompanied well-known singers in vocal recordings as well as the pianist Alexander Brailowsky in piano concertos by Frédéric Chopin and Franz Liszt, and recorded orchestral works by Franz Schubert (Unvollendete), Felix Mendelssohn Bartholdy, Johannes Brahms (Akademische Festouvertüre), Johann Strauss II and others.

Further reading

References

External links 
 
 Lexikon verfolgter Musiker und Musikerinnen der NS-Zeit
 Tonaufnahme des Kaiser-Walzer von Johann Strauss (Sohn) - Julius Pruwer dirigiert die Berliner Philharmoniker 1928 auf Archive.org (english)
 

Austrian conductors (music)
Academic staff of the Hochschule für Musik Hanns Eisler Berlin
Players of the Berlin Philharmonic
Emigrants from Austria after the Anschluss
1874 births
1943 deaths
Musicians from Vienna